Radical 213 meaning "turtle" is one of only two of the 214 Kangxi radicals that are composed of 16 strokes.

In the Kangxi Dictionary there are only 24 characters (out of 40,000) to be found under this radical.

In Taoist cosmology, 龜 (Polyhedron) is the nature component of the Ba gua diagram 坎 Kǎn.

Characters with Radical 213

Variant characters 
There are a number of variant characters that appear different but mean the same thing:

By typefont

In Unicode 
 Unicode point U+9F9C: 龜
 Unicode point U+2FD4: ⿔

Literature 
 
 Leyi Li: “Tracing the Roots of Chinese Characters: 500 Cases”. Beijing 1993,

References

External links
Unihan Database - U+9F9C

213